Eduardo Passarelli (20 July 1903 – 9 December 1968) was an Italian film actor. He appeared in 43 films between 1937 and 1962.

Life and career
Born Eduardo De Filippo in Naples, the son of Eduardo Scarpetta, he was the brother-in-law of Eduardo, Peppino and Titina De Filippo. He started his career on stage, in which he worked very often as a sidekick of Totò, as well as with Aldo Fabrizi, Nino Taranto and Anna Proclemer. In films he was mainly active in character roles.

Filmography

References

External links

1903 births
1968 deaths
Italian male film actors
20th-century Italian male actors